The Illinois State Superintendent of Education, often shortened to State Superintendent, is a statewide government office in the U.S. state of Illinois.

The State Superintendent is nominated by the Governor of Illinois and serves at the pleasure of the Illinois State Board of Education.  Since at least 2007, the Superintendent is hired at the beginning of a new gubernatorial term after the governor appoints the State Board of Education.  The State Superintendent is the chief education officer of the state, and the chief executive officer of the State Board of Education, but is prohibited from being a member of the Board.

 the Superintendent of Public Instruction; the old name is still referred to in some laws.
  The powers and duties of the Office of the Superintendent of Public Instruction were transferred to the Illinois State Board of Education on January 12, 1975.

The current officeholder is Dr. Carmen I. Ayala. Ayala is the first Latina and female to hold the position on a full-time basis.

List of office holders

Elected
Ninian Wirt Edwards (1854–1857)
William H. Powell (1857–1859)
Newton Bateman (1859–1863)
John P. Brooks (1863–1865)
Newton Bateman (1865–1875)
Samuel M. Etter (1875–1879)
James P. Slade (1879–1883)
Henry Raab (1883–1887)
Richard Edwards (1887–1891)
Henry Raab (1891–1895)
Samuel Inglis (1895–1898)
Joseph H. Freeman (1898–1899)
Alfred Bayliss (1899–1907)
Francis G. Blair (1907–1935)
John A. Wieland (1935–1943)
Vernon L. Nickell (1943–1959)
George T. Wilkins (1959–1963)
Ray Page (1963–1971)
Michael Bakalis (1971–1975)

Appointed (1975–present)
Joseph Cronin (1975–1980)
Donald Gill (1981–1984)
Ted Sanders (1985–1989)
Robert Leininger (1990–1994)
Mary Jane Broncato (1994) (temporary)
Joseph Spagnolo (1994–1998)
Glen "Max" McGee (1998–2001)
Ernest Wish (2002) (1 month)
Respico Vazquez (2002) (temporary)
Robert Schiller (2002–2004)
Randy Dunn (2004–2006)
Christopher Koch (2006–2015)
Tony Smith (from 2015 to 2019)
Dr. Carmen I. Ayala (2019–Present)

References

1854 establishments in Illinois